Uhrig is a surname. Notable people with the surname include:

Michelle Uhrig (born 1996), German speed skater
Peter Uhrig (born 1965), German lightweight rower
Robert Uhrig (1903–1944), German communist and resistance fighter against National Socialism
Romina Uhrig (born 1988), Argentine politician